Ludwig Venetianer (May 19, 1867 in Kecskemét – November 25, 1922 in Újpest) was a Hungarian rabbi and writer.

Venetianer was born in Kecskemét. He studied at the rabbinical seminary and the University of Budapest, at the Jewish Theological Seminary (Breslau) and the University of Breslau, 1888–89 (Ph.D. 1890, Budapest). Receiving his diploma as rabbi from the Budapest University of Jewish Studies in 1892, he officiated as rabbi at Somogy-Csurgó from that year to 1895, holding at the same time the chair of Hungarian and German literatures at the Evangelical Reform Gymnasium of that city. In 1895 he was called to the rabbinate of Lugos, and in the following year to the rabbinate of Újpest near Budapest.

Literary works 
Venetianer is the author of:
 A Fokozatok Könyve, on the sources of Shem-Tov ibn Falaquera (Szeged, 1890)
 A Felebaráti Szeretet a Zsidó Ethikában, on charity in Jewish ethics (Budapest, 1891)
 Das Buch der Grade von Schemtob ibn Falaquera (Berlin, 1894)
 Die Eleusinischen Mysterien im Jerusalemischen Tempel (Frankfurt am Main, 1897)
 A Héber-Magyar Összehasonlitó Nyelvészet, a history of Hebrew-Hungarian philology (Budapest, 1898)
 A Zsidóság Szervezete az Európai Államokban, a history of the Jewish communal constitution in Europe (ib. 1901)
 A Magyar Zsidóság Szervezetéről, a work treating of the organization of the Jews in Hungary (ib. 1903)
 A Zsidóság Eszméi és Tanai, a treatise on the conceptions and doctrines of Judaism (ib. 1904).
 Ludwig Venetianer: Jüdisches im Christentum  (Frankfurt am Main, 1913). Marianna Varga, Erinnerung an Ludwig Venetianer, Emlékezés Venetianer Lajosra, Tanulmány, Studie. Deutsch, Ungarisch. Peter W. Metzler Verlag (Duisburg, 2004)  
 Ludwig Venetianer: Die Messiashoffnung des Judenthums, Vortrag (Wien, 1915), Peter W. Metzler Verlag, (Duisburg, 2006) 
 Ludwig Venetianer: Die Messiashoffnung des Judentums, Vortrag (Wien, 1915), Peter W. Metzler Verlag, (Duisburg, 2010) 
 Lajos / Ludwig Venetianer: Kossuth Lajos, Emlekbeszed, Gedenkansprache (Somogy Csurgói, 1894). 1848 Marczius 15., Ünnepi Beszed, Festansprache (Ujpest, 1898). Die Messiashoffnung des Judentums, Vortrag (Wien, 1915), Peter W. Metzler Verlag, (Duisburg, 2010) 

He has also contributed numerous articles to periodicals, including Egyenlőség, Társadalmi Lapok, Jahrbuch des Litteraturvereins, Pesti Napló, Magyar-Zsidó Szemle, Orientalistische Litteraturzeitung, Ethnographia, and Bloch's Festschrift (supplement to the Österreichische Wochenschrift); and he has published some sermons in Hungarian.

Bibliography 
 A. Csurgói, Tanitó-Képző Intézet Története, p. 45;
 Gesch. des Jüdisch-Theologischen Seminars in Breslau, p. 199.
 Marianna Varga, Ludwig Venetianer: Jüdisches im Christentum (Frankfurt am Main, 1913). Erinnerung an Ludwig Venetianer Emlékezés Venetianer Lajosra. Tanulmány Studie, Deutsch, Ungarisch. (Peter W. Metzler Verlag, Duisburg 2004)  
 Ludwig Venetianer: Die Messiashoffnung des Judenthums. Vortrag (Wien, 1915). (Peter W. Metzler Verlag, Duisburg 2006)  http://www.metzler-verlag.de

External links
Jewish Encyclopedia: "Venetianer, Ludwig" by Isidore Singer (1906).

Hungarian rabbis
Hungarian writers
Austro-Hungarian Jews
People from Újpest
People from Csurgó
People from Kecskemét
1867 births
1922 deaths